Members of the New South Wales Legislative Assembly who served in the sixth parliament of New South Wales held their seats from 1869 to 1872. The 1869–70 election was held between 3 December 1869 and 10 January 1870 with parliament first meeting on 27 January 1870. There were 72 members elected for 52 single member electorates, 6 two member electorates and 2 four member electorates. Due to a change in the Constitution of New South Wales the maximum term of this parliament was reduced from 5 years to 3. However the assembly was dissolved after only 25 months after the third government of Sir James Martin lost a vote of supply. The Speaker was William Arnold.

See also
Second Robertson ministry
Fifth Cowper ministry
Third Martin ministry
Results of the 1869–70 New South Wales colonial election
Candidates of the 1869–70 New South Wales colonial election

Notes
There was no party system in New South Wales politics until 1887. Under the constitution, ministers were required to resign to recontest their seats in a by-election when appointed. These by-elections are only noted when the minister was defeated; in general, he was elected unopposed.

References

Members of New South Wales parliaments by term
19th-century Australian politicians